John Mann is an American engineer known for his design of the PRS Vibrato/Tuning system. Today, PRS Guitars has grown into a very successful company endorsing many artists including Carlos Santana and John Mayer.

History with Paul Reed Smith

John Mann first met Paul in 1978 when he wanted to have a trashed Gibson SG refinished. At that time, John worked at Westinghouse, a large research and development engineering facility for the Navy on the outskirts of Annapolis, Maryland. Mann built many components for the early guitars such as the 4-spring vibrato tailpieces.

John Mann and Paul Reed Smith made history together when their PRS vibrato/tuning system received its U.S. patent. The two men have worked closely together since 1978, when they first met at Paul's one-man workshop on West Street, in Annapolis, Maryland.

References

Living people
21st-century American engineers
American luthiers
Year of birth missing (living people)
Businesspeople from Maryland